The 7th Aerobic Gymnastics European Championships was held in Bucharest, Romania from 9 to 13 November 2011.

Results

Women's Individual

Men’s Individual

Mixed pair

Trio

Groups

Medal table

References

External links
European Union of Artistic Gymnastics Statistics: 7th European Championships 2011 - Bucharest

Aerobic Gymnastics European Championships
2011 in gymnastics
2011 in Romanian sport
2010s in Bucharest
Sports competitions in Bucharest
International gymnastics competitions hosted by Romania
November 2011 sports events in Romania